The 2011 VLN Series was the 34th season of the VLN.

Calendar

Race Results
Results indicate overall winners only.

Footnotes

References

External links 
 
 

2011 in German motorsport
Nürburgring Endurance Series seasons